William Townley Mitford (27 June 1817 – 18 April 1889) was a Victorian Conservative Party politician in Britain.

He was born at Pitshill in West Sussex in 1817. He built Bedham school near Fittleworth, which was later used as a church and is now derelict.

He served as Member of Parliament for Midhurst from 1859 to 1874.

Notes

References

External links 
 

1817 births
1889 deaths
High Sheriffs of Sussex
Conservative Party (UK) MPs for English constituencies
UK MPs 1859–1865
UK MPs 1865–1868
UK MPs 1868–1874
People from Chichester District